William P. Nagle Jr. is an American politician. Nagle was born in Northampton, Massachusetts and graduated from Northampton High School. He graduated from Saint Anselm College in 1973. Nagle served on the Northampton City Council in 1973 and is a Democrat. He then served in the Massachusetts House of Representatives from 1975 to 2002.

Notes

1951 births
Living people
Politicians from Northampton, Massachusetts
Saint Anselm College alumni
Massachusetts city council members
Democratic Party members of the Massachusetts House of Representatives